In mathematics, the quantum dilogarithm is a special function defined by the formula

It is the same as the q-exponential function .

Let  be "q-commuting variables", that is elements of a suitable noncommutative algebra satisfying Weyl's relation . Then, the quantum dilogarithm satisfies Schützenberger's identity

Faddeev-Volkov's identity

and Faddeev-Kashaev's identity

The latter is known to be a quantum generalization of Rogers' five term dilogarithm identity.

Faddeev's quantum dilogarithm  is defined by the following formula:

 

where the contour of integration  goes along the real axis outside a small neighborhood of the origin and deviates into the upper half-plane near the origin. The same function can be described by the integral formula of Woronowicz:

 

Ludvig Faddeev discovered the quantum pentagon identity:

 

and the inversion relation

 

The quantum dilogarithm finds applications in mathematical physics, quantum topology, cluster algebra theory.

References

External links 
 

Special functions
Q-analogs